The Europlanetarium Genk is a people's observatory and planetarium in Genk, Belgium.

How it began
Lode Vanhoutte from Genk started the Young Researchers for Genk following the moon landing in 1969. They did popular scientific work, many subjects were treated but astronomy turned out to be the most interesting one and they found a home base with the Association For Astronomy (AFA). The observatories of Grimbergen and Hove  were already operating for many years at that time. The AFA and especially Armand Pien (former television weatherman) suggested expanding to a full people's observatory in every Flemish province. Some people thought to place the third Flemish people's observatory in Genk. At first there would come a small ground floor observatory, but the plans got bigger and bigger constantly.

Definite plans
The promotion of the people's observatory started in 1977. The idea of a small observatory was then converted into a more large-scale plan with a professional style. A course of General Astronomy for novices started in 1979 while a small group of members occupied themselves with the business side of the foundation of the observatory.

Meanwhile, the revamped plans of the observatory contained a dome building and an exhibition space. The actual dome and telescope room would be 5 m (16,40 feet) above the ground floor. This room is in contrast with the ‘classic observatories’ square with a ring beam in the ceiling that supports the dome. It was decided to build the dome locally in order to keep the prices down and to maintain a good relationship with the municipality.

Opening
The finishing year would be 1983. The active members of the observatory finished beside the self built dome also a large part of the interior design. The eventual opening was in 1984.

The geological garden Georama was officially occupied on 9 July 1988, with this a special valuable link was added to the chain of attractive elements that makes this colourful municipality to the attraction of Limburg par excellence. Georama is truly a unique and informative scheme. A scientific image of 570 million years geological history is reproduced here in an utmost pleasant style and this in such a way that it can captivate and appeal to both the specialist, the student or the passer-by.

Planetarium
The idea to adjoin a planetarium to the existing people's observatory occurred in view of the precarious economical problems of the mine area and the need to expand a sustainable tourist infrastructure for Genk. The extension of a planetarium in Genk offered after all the possibility to attract visitors form the entire Euregion and to give the recreation area Kattevennen the appearance it intended and deserved. The exceeded tourist character of the planetarium project for the region is part of the conversion of the eastern mine area.

The extension of a planetarium near an existing and well elaborated people's observatory is a logical extension since a planetarium can show the star-spangled sky as well by day as at night under ideal (cloudless) circumstances. Movements of various celestial bodies can be accelerated in order to make astronomical concepts clear.

There were three partners for the construction: the EEC (50%), the Flemish General Commissioner's office for Tourism (40%) and the local authority of Genk (10%). The EEC had given permission for this project in 1987. Two files were prepared, for the planetarium instrument and the construction. Architect Jos Hanssen made a preliminary design and later a final design for the amount of €450 000.

However all plans could not go through because the cost amount eventually turned out to €600 000. The upper storey was not placed and considered as an option for the future. The secretariat room, the auditorium and the extra toilets were also not in the plans anymore. Everything should have been ready at the end of 1990 so that the most modern planetarium of the Benelux could open its doors. At the end of 1989 at least 20% of the subsidized amount had to be spent for the planetarium project. The construction of the planetarium started and it was decided to purchase the medium-sized planetarium SPACEMASTER from East-Germany and a dome with a diameter of 12,5 meter (41,01 feet).

The construction and the install of the instrument clearly needed more time than expected so 1990 would not be the year of opening, but 1991 would be. The placement of the instrument came to fruition in January 1991. The finishing costs were estimated at €125 000 because of the continually rising construction costs.

During the summer holidays of 1991 the planetarium started with test shows for various groups, there still were not any seats placed. The 90 seats were finally placed in December 1991 and the sound equipment was completed. Meanwhile, much work was put into the finishing outside, clinkers and plants were placed in order to make the planetarium accessible and attractive. Host Armand Pien, together with about 200 guests, could finally declare the planetarium open!

Until May 1992 there were continuously live shows because the full installation was not still available. Seven monitors provided a planetarium show with various themes. After the delivery of the installation it was the intention to extend the automated projections, but with the possibility of providing live shows at any time. Schools especially appreciated this because they had cosmology in their syllabus and came to the planetarium with specific questions and assignments.

Extension
In 1993 a serious extension of both the audio-visual possibilities  and the planetarium itself started with the extension of an auditorium and office space. The Planet path that connects the Europlanetarium with the adjoining Heempark was realized.

The Laser was officially opened in 1998 together with the new planetarium show ‘Mars, back to the red planet’. As expected the visitors were impressed by the possibilities of such a laser. The installation of this laser lasted about five months.

The People's observatory of Limburg is also an institutional member of the International Planetary Society.

Future
From 2007 Kattevennen will be an entrance to ‘Hoge Kempen’, the biggest nature reserve of Flanders. The Europlanetarium will be the centre in this. There will be a new multifunctional building with a new reception centre, a new catering service, an additional exhibition space and a magnificent polyvalent reception infrastructure. The building will literally be a gate, because it will be built across the existing road and cyclists and walkers can just go underneath it.

See also
 List of astronomical observatories
 List of astronomical societies
 List of planetariums

References

External links
Official site (in Dutch)

Astronomical observatories in Belgium
Buildings and structures in Limburg (Belgium)
Tourist attractions in Limburg (Belgium)
Planetaria in Belgium
Genk